The Chris Gethard Show is a television show created by and starring comedian Chris Gethard.

The series aired 201 episodes and 20 specials from June 22, 2011, to December 4, 2020, on the public-access Manhattan Neighborhood Network and cable networks Fusion and truTV.

Series overview

Manhattan Neighborhood Network (2011–15)

Season 1 (2011–14)

Season 2 (2014)

Season 3 (2015)

Fusion (2015–16)

Season 1 (2015)

Season 2 (2016)

truTV (2017–18)

Specials

References

Notes

External links
 Official website
 The Chris Gethard Show on YouTube

Lists of American non-fiction television series episodes